Toshiko Akiyoshi at Maybeck is a solo jazz piano album recorded by Toshiko Akiyoshi at the Maybeck Recital Hall in Berkeley, California and released on the Concord Jazz record label. It is Volume 36 in Concord's "Maybeck Recital Hall Series".

Reception

In a review for AllMusic, Richard S. Ginell called the recording "one of the more individual solo albums in the Maybeck series," and stated that Akiyoshi "has her own distinct ideas" and "is especially compelling when her hands fly off in multiple directions."

Track listing 
"Village" (Akiyoshi) – 5:59
"Come Sunday" (Ellington) – 4:37
"Con Alma" (Gillespie) – 5:28
"Polka Dots and Moonbeams" (Burke, Van Heusen) – 7:02
"It Was a Very Good Year" (Drake) – 5:34
"Things We Did Last Summer" (Cahn, Styne) – 7:44
"Old Devil Moon" (Harburg, Lane) – 6:04
"Sophisticated Lady" (Ellington, Mills, Parish) – 6:09
"Quadrille, Anyone?" (Akiyoshi) – 5:45
"Tempus Fugit" (Powell) – 3:50

References

Toshiko Akiyoshi live albums
1994 live albums
Concord Records live albums
Albums recorded at the Maybeck Recital Hall
Solo piano jazz albums